Cremastobombycia ambrosiaeella is a moth of the family Gracillariidae. It is known from Ontario and Quebec Canada, and Illinois, Kentucky, Texas, Maine and New York in the United States.

The wingspan is 5.5-6.5 mm.

The larvae feed on Ambrosia species (including Ambrosia artemisiifolia and Ambrosia trifida), Helianthus species (including Helianthus giganteus), Heterotera squarrosa, Ridania alternifolia and Verbesina species (including Verbesina alternifolia). They mine the leaves of their host plant. The mine has the form of a tentiform mine on the underside of the leaf. The mine is very small, almost circular and is not visible on the upperside as an inflated swelling. The dense white fusiform cocoon, suspended hammock-like in the mine, has a smooth surface.

References

External links
mothphotographersgroup
Cremastobombycia at microleps.org

Lithocolletinae
Moths of North America
Lepidoptera of Canada
Lepidoptera of the United States
Leaf miners
Moths described in 1871
Taxa named by Vactor Tousey Chambers